The Chess Hotel is the third full-length album from American rock band The Elms. The album was released May 2, 2006, on Universal South Records.

The album was co-produced by The Elms and David Bianco and marked a stylistic shift in the band's sound towards a heavier, sparse blues-infused sound. Reviews of the album were favorable, and critics likened the album's sound to The Rolling Stones, Led Zeppelin, and The White Stripes.

Track listing 
 I Am the World
 Who Puts Rock & Roll in Your Blood?
 Nothin' to Do with Love
 Makes Good Sense
 I Left My Body and Never Came Back
 She's Cold!
 The Chess Hotel
 Bring Me Your Tea
 The Way I Will
 The Downtown King
 Black Peach
 The Towers & the Trains
 I've Been Wrong

Recording 
The Chess Hotel was recorded in Franklin, Tennessee at Dark Horse Studios. The album was mixed at Scream Studios in Los Angeles, California.

Personnel 
 The Elms
 Owen Thomas - lead vocals, guitar, percussion, songwriting
 Christopher Thomas - drums, percussion
 Thomas Daugherty - lead guitar, vocals
 Nathan W. Bennett - bass guitar, vocals

 Additional
 David Bianco - co-producer, engineer, mix engineer
 Eddie Schreyer - mastering engineer

References 

2006 albums
The Elms (band) albums